Dr Saliha Mahmood-Ahmed  (born 23 October 1987) is a British chef and winner of the BBC's MasterChef competition in 2017.

Her final menu was to prepare a three-course meal for judges John Torode and Gregg Wallace which consisted of:

 First course: Venison shami kebab with cashew and coriander green chutney, chana daal and a kachumbar salad
 Main course: Kashmiri style sous-vide duck breast, with crispy duck skin, freekeh wheatgrain, spiced with dried barberries, walnuts and coriander, a cherry chutney and a duck and cherry sauce
 Dessert: Saffron rosewater and cardamom panna cotta, served with a deconstructed baklava, including candied pistachios, pistachio honeycomb, filo pastry shards and kumquats

Early life
Mahmood-Ahmed was born and raised in Ickenham, Middlesex.

Career
She was educated at Beaconsfield High School for girls (Grammar School for girls) and studied Medicine at Kings College graduating in 2012. She began her career in medicine as a junior doctor working for the NHS at St Mary's Hospital specialising in gastroenterology. She has subsequently worked at Hillingdon Hospital and Watford General Hospital.

She began cooking at the age of 12 and was heavily influenced by the Kashmiri style of cooking of her maternal grandmother and mother.

Publications
 Khazana – A Treasure Trove of Modern Mughal Dishes (2018). Awarded Best New Cookbook by The Guardian (2019)

Personal life
Mahmood-Ahmed has been married to Usman Ahmed since August 2013. Her husband is also a doctor, specialising in acute medicine. Their first son, Aashir, was born in October 2014 and their second in March 2020.

References

External links

Living people
1987 births
British chefs
Reality cooking competition winners
English television chefs
English people of Pakistani descent
Women chefs